Amino acid oxidoreductases are oxidoreductases, a type of enzyme, that act upon amino acids.

They constitute the majority of enzymes classified under EC number 1.4, with most of the remainder being monoamine oxidases.

Examples include: 
 Glutamate dehydrogenase
 Nitric oxide synthase

External links
 

EC 1.4